Needless (stylized as NEEDLESS) is a Japanese manga and anime. This may also refer to:

Something unnecessary to be needed.

See also
Need (disambiguation)